Elections to Strabane District Council were held on 21 May 1997 on the same day as the other Northern Irish local government elections. The election used three district electoral areas to elect a total of 16 councillors.

Election results

Note: "Votes" are the first preference votes.

Districts summary

|- class="unsortable" align="centre"
!rowspan=2 align="left"|Ward
! % 
!Cllrs
! % 
!Cllrs
! %
!Cllrs
! %
!Cllrs
! % 
!Cllrs
!rowspan=2|TotalCllrs
|- class="unsortable" align="center"
!colspan=2 bgcolor="" | SDLP
!colspan=2 bgcolor="" | Sinn Féin
!colspan=2 bgcolor="" | UUP
!colspan=2 bgcolor="" | DUP
!colspan=2 bgcolor="white"| Others
|-
|align="left"|Derg
|17.2
|1
|32.1
|1
|bgcolor="40BFF5"|33.8
|bgcolor="40BFF5"|2
|16.9
|1
|0.0
|0
|5
|-
|align="left"|Glenelly
|19.5
|1
|19.3
|1
|27.7
|1
|bgcolor="#D46A4C"|30.1
|bgcolor="#D46A4C"|2
|3.4
|0
|5
|-
|align="left"|Mourne
|30.6
|3
|bgcolor="#008800"|45.3
|bgcolor="#008800"|2
|11.6
|0
|0.0
|0
|12.5
|1
|6
|-
|- class="unsortable" class="sortbottom" style="background:#C9C9C9"
|align="left"| Total
|22.9
|5
|33.1
|4
|23.6
|3
|14.7
|3
|5.7
|1
|16
|-
|}

District results

Derg

1993: 1 x UUP, 1 x Sinn Féin, 1 x SDLP, 1 x DUP, 1 x Independent Unionist
1997: 2 x UUP, 1 x Sinn Féin, 1 x SDLP, 1 x DUP
1993-1997 Change: Independent Unionist joins UUP

Glenelly

1993: 2 x DUP, 2 x UUP, 1 x SDLP
1997: 2 x DUP, 1 x UUP, 1 x SDLP, 1 x Sinn Féin
1993-1997 Change: Sinn Féin gain from UUP

Mourne

1993: 3 x SDLP, 1 x Sinn Féin, 1 x UUP, 1 x Independent Nationalist
1997: 3 x SDLP, 2 x Sinn Féin, 1 x Independent Nationalist
1993-1997 Change: Sinn Féin gain from UUP

References

Strabane District Council elections
Strabane